Chris Collins may refer to:

Arts and entertainment
 Chris Collins or K. C. Collins, Canadian-born American actor
 Chris Collins (musician) (born 1967), American musician, recording engineer/producer and technologist
 Chris Collins (singer), former vocalist for the band now known as Dream Theater
 Chris Collins (writer), American television writer
 Chris Collins, gardening expert on the television programme Blue Peter

Politics 
 Chris Collins (Canadian politician) (born 1962), Member of the Legislative Assembly from Moncton, New Brunswick, Canada
 Chris Collins (New York politician) (born 1950), former U.S. Representative for New York's 27th congressional district
 Chris Collins (Virginia politician) (born 1971), member of the Virginia House of Delegates

Sports 
 Chris Collins (basketball) (born 1974), basketball player and coach from Northbrook, Illinois
 Chris Collins (ice hockey) (born 1984), American ice hockey player 
 Chris Collins (lacrosse) (born 1982), American lacrosse player
 Chris Collins (soccer) (born 1956), retired American soccer player
 Chris Collins (American football) (born 1982), American football player
 Chris Collins (boxer) (born 1960), boxer from Grenada

See also
 Christopher Collins (disambiguation)
 Christine Collins (1888–1964), Los Angeles mother whose 9-year-old son went missing
 Collins (surname)